NGC 521, also occasionally referred to as PGC 5190 or UGC 962, is a spiral galaxy located approximately 224 million light-years from the Solar System in the constellation Cetus. It was discovered on 8 October 1785 by astronomer William Herschel.

Observation history

Historic observation
Herschel described his discovery as "faint, pretty large, irregular round, brighter middle". Further observations were made by both his son, John Herschel, who simply noted "big" on his first and "very faint" on his second observation, as well as R. J. Mitchell, who noted "pretty big, spiral galaxy, disc enveloped in faint outlying neby and looks like an unresolved cluster." NGC 521 was later catalogued by John Louis Emil Dreyer in the New General Catalogue, where the galaxy was described as "faint, pretty large, round, gradually brighter middle".

Supernovae
A total of three supernovae have been assigned to NGC 521, with SN 1966G being the first to be observed in 1966, followed by SN 1982O in 1982 and the most recent being SN 2006G in 2005.

Description 
The galaxy's large apparent size can be attributed to the fact that it is face-on. Despite its size, it only has an apparent visual magnitude of 11.7. It can be classified as spiral galaxy of type SBbc using the Hubble Sequence. The object's distance of roughly 220 million light-years from the Solar System can be estimated using its redshift and Hubble's law.

See also 
 List of NGC objects (1–1000)

References

External links 

 
 SEDS

Spiral galaxies
Cetus (constellation)
0521
5190
00962
Astronomical objects discovered in 1785
Discoveries by William Herschel